Fairbridge, Western Australia is a former farm school near Pinjarra in Southwest Western Australia. It is now used predominantly for education, school and community camps and tourism purposes.

History 

On 15 April 1912, Kingsley Fairbridge and his wife, Ruby Fairbridge, arrived in Albany, Western Australia, from England and made their way to Pinjarra, arriving on 16 July that same year to establish the world's first Fairbridge Farm School. The school opened on 19 October 1912. Kingsley wanted to see "little children shedding the bondage of unfortunate circumstances and stretching their legs and minds amid the thousand interests of the farm."

Child migration 
From 1913 to 1982, Fairbridge Farm School was home to a total of 3,580 children who came to Fairbridge under various child migration schemes. The school provided education in task-learning, husbandry, metal work and wood work. During World War II, Dutch refugee children evacuated from Indonesia were based at Fairbridge while they were waiting to be reunited with their families. The site was also used as a training ground for the Women's Land Army, and Guildford Grammar School partially relocated there while their school was used as a hospital base. An airfield was constructed and operated from the school during the Second World War until the 1950s.

The Australian Heritage Commission commented, when announcing the listing of Fairbridge on the Interim List of the Register of the National Estate in December 1997 that "Fairbridge is a striking example of Australia’s early philanthropic movement to resettle and educate migrant children."  The Chair of the Heritage Commission at the time, Wendy McCarthy stated that "'by entering Fairbridge in the Interim List of the Register of the National Estate, we are not only recognising the efforts of this philanthropist, Kingsley Fairbridge, but also its role in a significant phase in Australia’s migration history. From 1912 to 1980, Fairbridge Pinjarra played a significant role in the development of the British Empire and Australian migration history on child, single parent and family migration schemes.

Forgotten Australians 

Many of the child migrants were falsely told that they were orphans and consequently never saw their families again. In 1986, the first Australian child migrant approached the British government to seek reparation. The approach eventually led to the establishment of the Child Migrant Trust in 1987. The Australian Government apologised for its involvement in the scheme, and in 1998 the Western Australian Government apologised to the former child migrants: "The Western Australian Government apologises to former child migrants who suffered physical, emotional and sexual abuse in the state's institutions". The following year the Christian Brothers, Sisters of Mercy and Poor Sisters of Nazareth launched a computerised personal history index to the records of former child migrants.

On 24 February 2010, British Prime Minister Gordon Brown made a formal apology to the families of children who suffered. On 31 January 2019, the UK Government announced that following the Independent Inquiry into Child Sexual Abuse, which handed down its report in May 2018, the UK Government would make an ex-gratia payment of 20,000 to any former British child migrant who was alive on 1 March 2018, or if alive as at that date and since deceased, the payment would be made to the deceased's beneficiaries.

In July 2020, it was reported that the Australian Government had named Fairbridge Restored Limited as one of six institutions that had failed to sign up for the National Redress Scheme by the June 30 deadline. In November 2020, The Guardian reported that Fairbridge Restored Limited was dormant and under administration, and that the administrator, Chris Laverty, had claimed that insolvency law in the UK meant Fairbridge was unable to comply with the redress scheme criteria.

Fairbridge Chapel 

The chapel is the only building in Australia designed, and with construction overseen by noted British architect Sir Herbert Baker. Described as "the architectural jewel in the crown" of Fairbridge Village, the chapel was built in 1930–31 by the Western Australian Government with construction funded by British interests.

Current use 
Fairbridge Western Australia Inc. was established as a charity in 1983 and owns and operates Fairbridge Village. The organisation runs programs and services for young people including an independent school, registered training organisation, school and community camps. Fairbridge work closely with local employee Alcoa providing traineeships to youth from the local community.

As a not for profit organisation all surplus funds are invested to provide opportunities for youth.

The  Village is run as a training facility for young people and as a tourist destination providing visitors with accommodation, catering and activities in its historic surroundings.  It is the only Fairbridge Farm School site remaining out of the eight that were originally built around the world.

Fairbridge offers historical tours and activities.  It has a number of buildings which are used as conference and function venues and a coffee shop featuring local artworks.

Fairbridge Village consists of 55 heritage listed buildings and ten newer buildings. The Village also has a chapel, dining hall, single and double storey cottages, training and sporting facilities. Accommodation can hold 370 people.  There are 23 different self-contained cottages that sleep from 2 to 56 people.

Guests staying at the village have access to a  swimming pool, full sized sporting oval, tennis, beach volleyball, mini golf, art gallery and museum.

Fairbridge was WA Tourism Award's Silver Medallist 2006 and 2007.

See also
Fairbridge Festival
Fairbridge (charity)
Margaret Humphreys
Oranges and Sunshine

References

External links

Further reading
 
 

Education in Western Australia
Shire of Murray
Educational institutions established in 1912
Defunct schools in Western Australia
1912 establishments in Australia
Educational institutions disestablished in 1982
State Register of Heritage Places in the Shire of Murray